Lucian Tudor Bot (born December 15, 1979, in Cluj-Napoca), is a Romanian professional boxer in the Heavyweight division.

Professional career
He turned pro in 2002.

Professional record

|-
|align="center" colspan=8|17 Wins (5 knockouts, 12 decisions), 3 Losses, 2 Draws 
|-
|align=center style="border-style: none none solid solid; background: #e3e3e3"|Res.
|align=center style="border-style: none none solid solid; background: #e3e3e3"|Record
|align=center style="border-style: none none solid solid; background: #e3e3e3"|Opponent
|align=center style="border-style: none none solid solid; background: #e3e3e3"|Type
|align=center style="border-style: none none solid solid; background: #e3e3e3"|Rd., Time
|align=center style="border-style: none none solid solid; background: #e3e3e3"|Date
|align=center style="border-style: none none solid solid; background: #e3e3e3"|Location
|align=center style="border-style: none none solid solid; background: #e3e3e3"|Notes
|-align=center
|Win
|17-3-2
|align=left| Sergio Romano
| UD || 6 
|2018-04-28 || align=left| Sala de Sport, Sânmartin
|align=left|
|-align=center
|Loss
|16-3-2
|align=left| Cyril Leonet
| UD || 12 
|2015-12-05 || align=left| Palais des Sports de Beaublanc, Limoges
|align=left|
|-align=center
|Loss
|16-2-2
|align=left| Faisal Ibnel Arrami
| UD || 10 
|2015-04-25 || align=left| Palais des Sports de Toulon, Toulon
|align=left|
|-align=center
|Draw
|16-1-2
|align=left| Antonio Sousa
| SD || 6 
|2015-02-21 || align=left| Sala Sporturilor, Cluj-Napoca
|align=left|
|-align=center
|Win
|16-1-1
|align=left| Ferenc Zsalek
| PTS || 6 
|2013-06-20 || align=left| Sala Sporturilor, Cluj-Napoca
|align=left|
|-align=center
|Win
|15-1-1
|align=left| Aleksandrs Selezens
| UD || 6 
|2012-11-29 || align=left| Sala Polivalentă, Craiova
|align=left|
|-align=center
|Loss
|14-1-1
|align=left| Konstantin Airich
| UD || 3 
|2011-05-07 || align=left| Alexandra Palace, London
|align=left|
|-align=center
|Win
|14-0-1
|align=left| Pāvels Dolgovs
| UD || 6 
|2010-04-10 || align=left| Rapid Sportin Hall, Bucharest
|align=left|
|-align=center
|Win
|13-0-1
|align=left| Yavor Marinchev
| UD ||  
|2009-06-05 || align=left| Sala Rapid, Bucharest
|align=left|
|-align=center
|Win
|12-0-1
|align=left| Viktor Szalai
| TKO || 1 
|2008-12-19 || align=left| Merkur Casino, Ploiești
|align=left|
|-align=center
|Win
|11-0-1
|align=left| Alcides Dosul
| UD || 6 
|2008-04-19 || align=left| Pabellon Municipal, Vélez-Málaga
|align=left|
|-align=center
|Win
|10-0-1
|align=left| Nuno Andres da Silva
| TKO || 1 
|2007-09-28 || align=left| Valencia
|align=left|
|-align=center
|Win
|9-0-1
|align=left| Jevgenijs Stamburskis
| RTD || 4 
|2007-07-12 || align=left| Sala Sporturilor, Constanța
|align=left|
|-align=center
|Win
|8-0-1
|align=left| Paata Berikashvili
| SD || 6 
|2007-04-13 || align=left| Sala Sporturilor, Drobeta-Turnu Severin
|align=left|
|-align=center
|Win
|7-0-1
|align=left| Sandor Forgacs
| PTS || 4 
|2006-07-21 || align=left| Timișoara
|align=left|
|-align=center
|Win
|6-0-1
|align=left| Jose Rodriguez
| PTS || 4 
|2006-05-19 || align=left| Brăila
|align=left|
|-align=center
|Win
|5-0-1
|align=left| Valentin Marinel
| TKO || 3 
|2005-10-21 || align=left| Sala Sporturilor, Arad
|align=left|
|-align=center
|Win
|4-0-1
|align=left| Romeo Ocolișan
| TKO || 5 
|2005-09-23 || align=left| Craiova
|align=left|
|-align=center
|Draw
|3-0-1
|align=left| Danuț Moisa
| PTS || 4 
|2005-07-08 || align=left| Callatis, Mangalia
|align=left|
|-align=center
|Win
|3-0
|align=left| Mihai Iftode
| PTS || 4 
|2005-06-03 || align=left| Sala Sporturilor, Râmnicu Vâlcea
|align=left|
|-align=center
|Win
|2-0
|align=left| Romeo Ocolișan
| PTS || 4 
|2002-11-15 || align=left| Unio Gym, Szekszárd
|align=left|
|-align=center
|Win
|1-0
|align=left| Attila Huszka
| PTS || 4 
|2002-10-25 || align=left| Unio Gym, Szekszárd
|align=left|
|-align=center

External links

Heavyweight boxers
1979 births
Living people
Romanian male boxers
Sportspeople from Cluj-Napoca